Tyson Stenglein (born 16 July 1980) is an Australian rules footballer, who played for the Adelaide Crows and the West Coast Eagles in the Australian Football League (AFL).

Adelaide career 
Stenglein was originally recruited to the AFL by the Adelaide Crows at pick number 29 in the 1998 draft from the Subiaco Football Club in the WAFL, and debuted in his first season (1999) against the West Coast Eagles in round eight at Subiaco Oval in Perth.

After playing four games in his debut season, Stenglein became a regular in the Crows side the next year, playing nearly every game over a four-year period, becoming a highly rated player at the club, and indeed often touted as a potential club captain.  After 106 games in six seasons at Adelaide he requested to be transferred back to a club in his home city of Perth, and was eventually traded to the Eagles in the trading period after the end of the 2004 season.

West Coast Eagles career 
Stenglein moved to West Coast leaving behind his strong fan base in Adelaide. At West Coast, Stenglein had an immediate impact, providing some hardness to a class midfield brigade, and almost immediately became a fixture in the team.  Stenglein was part of the Eagles' 2005 losing Grand Final team in his first season, a season in which he missed only three games.

During the turmoil of the West Coast Eagles 2006 pre-season, rumour suggested Stenglein was considered one of the possible choices to replace the disgraced Ben Cousins as club captain, but his lack of time at the club would have counted against him, and it was given to the obvious choice, champion Eagle Chris Judd.  During the 2006 season, Stenglein played every match, eventually becoming an AFL Premiership player when selected in the West Coast Eagles Grand Final winning side.

After playing 11 games in 2009, the Eagles star announced his retirement on 11 September 2009 at the West Coast club champions awards night despite having a year left on his contract.

Statistics

|- style="background-color: #EAEAEA"
! scope="row" style="text-align:center" | 1999
|style="text-align:center;"|
| 20 || 4 || 0 || 1 || 21 || 6 || 27 || 7 || 3 || 0.0 || 0.3 || 5.3 || 1.5 || 6.8 || 1.8 || 0.8
|-
! scope="row" style="text-align:center" | 2000
|style="text-align:center;"|
| 20 || 15 || 2 || 6 || 91 || 95 || 186 || 48 || 34 || 0.1 || 0.4 || 6.1 || 6.3 || 12.4 || 3.2 || 2.3
|- style="background:#eaeaea;"
! scope="row" style="text-align:center" | 2001
|style="text-align:center;"|
| 20 || 21 || 4 || 6 || 148 || 98 || 246 || 68 || 32 || 0.2 || 0.3 || 7.0 || 4.7 || 11.7 || 3.2 || 1.5
|-
! scope="row" style="text-align:center" | 2002
|style="text-align:center;"|
| 20 || 23 || 6 || 8 || 197 || 181 || 378 || 89 || 69 || 0.3 || 0.3 || 8.6 || 7.9 || 16.4 || 3.9 || 3.0
|- style="background:#eaeaea;"
! scope="row" style="text-align:center" | 2003
|style="text-align:center;"|
| 20 || 21 || 7 || 2 || 151 || 122 || 273 || 48 || 67 || 0.3 || 0.1 || 7.2 || 5.8 || 13.0 || 2.3 || 3.2
|-
! scope="row" style="text-align:center" | 2004
|style="text-align:center;"|
| 20 || 22 || 7 || 8 || 192 || 163 || 355 || 87 || 75 || 0.3 || 0.4 || 8.7 || 7.4 || 16.1 || 4.0 || 3.4
|- style="background:#eaeaea;"
! scope="row" style="text-align:center" | 2005
|style="text-align:center;"|
| 5 || 22 || 9 || 6 || 216 || 147 || 363 || 106 || 79 || 0.4 || 0.3 || 9.8 || 6.7 || 16.5 || 4.8 || 3.6
|- 
! scope="row" style="text-align:center;" | 2006
|style="text-align:center;"|
| 5 || 26 || 10 || 2 || 275 || 203 || 478 || 133 || 126 || 0.4 || 0.1 || 10.6 || 7.8 || 18.4 || 5.1 || 4.8
|- style="background:#eaeaea;"
! scope="row" style="text-align:center" | 2007
|style="text-align:center;"|
| 5 || 21 || 3 || 4 || 233 || 230 || 463 || 96 || 104 || 0.1 || 0.2 || 11.1 || 11.0 || 22.0 || 4.6 || 5.0
|- 
! scope="row" style="text-align:center" | 2008
|style="text-align:center;"|
| 5 || 22 || 1 || 1 || 166 || 158 || 324 || 65 || 89 || 0.0 || 0.0 || 7.5 || 7.2 || 14.7 || 3.0 || 4.0
|- style="background:#eaeaea;"
! scope="row" style="text-align:center" | 2009
|style="text-align:center;"|
| 5 || 11 || 2 || 1 || 63 || 96 || 159 || 34 || 43 || 0.2 || 0.1 || 5.7 || 8.7 || 14.5 || 3.1 || 3.9
|- class="sortbottom"
! colspan=3| Career
! 208
! 51
! 45
! 1753
! 1499
! 3252
! 781
! 721
! 0.2
! 0.2
! 8.4
! 7.2
! 15.6
! 3.8
! 3.5
|}

References

External links 

Subiaco Football Club players
West Coast Eagles players
West Coast Eagles Premiership players
1980 births
Living people
Adelaide Football Club players
Australian rules footballers from Perth, Western Australia
One-time VFL/AFL Premiership players